Ross Matheson (born 27 May 1970) is a former professional tennis player from Scotland.

College tennis
Matheson played collegiate tennis in the United States, first at the University of Oklahoma and then at Arizona State University.

Professional career
Matheson had the best win of his professional career at the 1993 Stella Artois Championships (Queen's), where he defeated 13th seed Jakob Hlasek in the opening round, despite being ranked 563rd in the world.

He appeared in the main singles draw at Wimbledon twice and was beaten in the first round on each occasion, to Joao Cunha-Silva in 1993 and David Wheaton in 1995, both in four sets.

He is the club manager at the All England Lawn Tennis and Croquet Club (2015).

Personal life
Matheson is the son of Harry Matheson, who competed in the 1963 Wimbledon Championships. His mother, Carole, was also a tennis player.
Ross and his wife Pam appeared in a 2021 episode of the Channel 4 TV show Location Location Location. They have two sons.

Challenger titles

Singles: (1)

Doubles: (1)

References

1970 births
Living people
Scottish male tennis players
Sportspeople from Glasgow
Oklahoma Sooners men's tennis players
Arizona State Sun Devils men's tennis players
British male tennis players